The Jaws of Life is the fifth studio album by American rock band Pierce the Veil, released on February 10, 2023. This is the band's first album not to feature drummer Mike Fuentes, with Brad Hargreaves of Third Eye Blind filling in. The band parted ways with Fuentes in 2017, following allegations of sexual misconduct. It is the first album to have a title track. The first single, "Pass the Nirvana", was released on September 1, 2022, marking the first piece of new material from the band since their 2016 album Misadventures. The album was announced November 11, 2022, along with the release of a second single, "Emergency Contact". The third single, "Even When I'm Not with You", was released January 12, 2023.

Background and recording 
In 2016, Pierce the Veil released their fourth album Misadventures, to critical acclaim. The band toured in support of the album from June 2016 until May 2017. In November 2017, two women came forward on Twitter detailing allegations of sexual misconduct against drummer Mike Fuentes, including statutory rape and solicitation of nude photos of a minor. Following these allegations, the band announced that Fuentes would be stepping back from the band indefinitely. In April 2020, the band shared an at-home performance of their song "Hold On Till May" to their YouTube channel, featuring Mike Fuentes alongside the other members of the band. This led to some controversy on social media, as well as confusion as to whether Fuentes had been reinstated as a band member. Vocalist and guitarist Vic Fuentes later clarified that Mike Fuentes had not been part of the band since 2017, and that he would not be featured on their next album.

The band began working on The Jaws of Life as early as 2018, with Vic Fuentes teasing new material on social media. Fuentes spent a brief period living with MxPx vocalist and bassist Mike Herrera during the production of the album. Parts of the record, including single "Emergency Contact", were written in Herrera's home studio in Seattle. The record was produced by Paul Meany and mixed by Adam Hawkins.

Composition 
The album features collaborations with Brad Hargreaves of Third Eye Blind and Chloe Moriondo. The album has been said to have a more "melodic and intimate" sound than past records, while also taking influence from grunge bands of the '90s.

On the album title, vocalist Vic Fuentes noted, "in short, it's just about how life can try and sink its teeth into you and devour you and trying to find your way out of that. I think this album represents getting out of that grip and seeing the light again and breaking through."

Tours

Live in the UK 

In December 2022, two months before the album's release, Pierce the Veil embarked on a brief promotional tour in the United Kingdom titled Live in the UK to support it. The tour began on December 1 in Cardiff and ended on December 10 in Leeds. The only two songs from The Jaws of Life that appeared on the setlist were "Pass the Nirvana" and "Emergency Contact". Against the Current and Carolesdaughter were the opening acts for all eight shows.

Shows

The Jaws of Life Tour 
{{Infobox concert
| concert_tour_name = The Jaws of Life Tour
| artist = Pierce the Veil
| border = yes
| location = 
| album = The Jaws of Life
| start_date = March 28, 2023
| end_date = April 13, 2024
| number_of_legs = 2
| number_of_shows = 17
| last_tour = Live in the UK(2022)
| this_tour = The Jaws of Life Tour(2023–24)
| support_acts = TBA
}}
In the coming years, Pierce the Veil will embark on their twenty-fifth headlining tour The Jaws of Life Tour in support of the album. The tour will begin on March 27, 2023 in Guadalajara, Mexico and is currently set to end on April 13, 2024 in London, England. Opening acts for the tour have yet to be announced.

 Shows 

 Creative Control Tour 
In North America, Pierce the Veil will embark on a co-headlining tour with The Used dubbed the Creative Control Tour''. DeathByRomy, Don Broco and Girlfriends will join as opening acts.

Shows

Australia Tour 2023 

On February 26, 2023, Beartooth and Pierce the Veil announced a co-headlining tour of Australia with Dayseeker as the opening act. It will begin on July 22 in Perth and end on July 29 in Brisbane.

Shows

Track listing

Personnel
Pierce the Veil
 Vic Fuentes – vocals, guitar (tracks 1–8, 10–12); percussion (1), music production (2), keyboards (3, 11)
 Tony Perry – guitar (1–8, 10–12)
 Jaime Preciado – bass guitar (1–8, 11, 12), engineering (2), programming (9, 10), keyboards (9), music production (10), guitar (11)

Additional musicians
 Brad Hargreaves – drums (1–8, 10–12), percussion (10)
 Paul Meany – keyboards (5, 11, 12), percussion (5)
 Leila Birch – spoken word (9)
 Chloe Moriondo – vocals (12)

Technical
 Paul Meany – production, recording production, engineering
 Ted Jensen – mastering
 Adam Hawkins – mixing
 David Garcia Marino – editing, engineering assistance
 Henry Lunetta – mixing assistance
 Steven Williamson – mixing assistance
 Adam Keil – engineering assistance
 Crispin Schroeder – engineering assistance
 Colin Holbrook – music production (1)
 David Dahlquist – music production (2)
 Pat Morrissey – music production (2)
 Steve Solomon – music production (11)
 Colin Brittain – engineering (8)

Charts

Notes

References

2023 albums
Fearless Records albums
Pierce the Veil albums